Rajja Rani is a 2018 Nepali romantic comedy film directed by Yam Thapa and produced by Ramesh MK Poudel. The film features Najir Hussain and Keki Adhikari in lead roles. It was released on 5 January 2018. The film has also been dubbed in Maithili version .

Rajja Rani is a story inspired by true incidents in Terai region of Nepal . The film touches on the issue of child marriage.

Plot
Rajja struggles for his love for Rani against the obstacles in their love due to the social and cultural values.

Cast
 Keki Adhikari as Rani
 Najir Hussain as Rajja Yadav 
 Kameshor Chaurasiya as Rajja's Friend 
 Deepak Kshetri as Rani's Father 
 Laxmi Bardewa

References

External links

Rajja Rani on dcnepalonline.com

2018 films
Nepalese romantic comedy films
2010s Nepali-language films
Films set in Nepal
2018 romantic comedy films